Perimä Vihassa Ja Verikostossa is the second EP by the Finnish black metal band Horna. It was released as a 10" picture disc EP and was limited to 500 copies, including a poster.

Track listing

Personnel

Additional personnel
 Christophe Szpajdel - logo

External links
Metal Archives
Official Horna Site

Horna EPs
1999 EPs